The Fijian dollar (currency sign: FJ$, $; currency code: FJD) has been the currency of Fiji since 1969 and was also the currency between 1867 and 1873. It is normally abbreviated with the dollar sign $, or alternatively FJ$ to distinguish it from other dollar-denominated currencies. It is divided into 100 cents.

History

Decimalisation origins
Fiji followed the pattern of South Africa, Australia, and New Zealand in that when it adopted the decimal system, it decided to use the half pound unit as opposed to the pound unit of account. The choice of the name dollar was motivated by the fact that the reduced value of the new unit corresponded more closely to the value of the US dollar than it did to the pound sterling.

Second dollar (1969–present)
The dollar was reintroduced on 15 January 1969, replacing the Fijian pound at a rate of 1 pound = 2 dollars, or 10 shillings = FJ$1. Despite Fiji having been a republic since 1987, coins and banknotes continued to feature Queen Elizabeth II until 2013, when her portrait was replaced with pictures of plants and animals.

Coinage

In 1969, coins were introduced in denominations of 1c, 2c, 5c, 10c & 20c, with a 50c coin issued in 1975. The coins had the same sizes and compositions as the corresponding Australian coins, with the 50 cents matching the cupronickel dodecagonal type introduced in Australia in 1969. In 1990, new compositions were introduced, with copper-plated zinc used for the 1¢ and 2¢ coins, and nickel-plated steel for the 5c, 10c, 20c & 50c. An aluminium-bronze  coin was introduced in 1995, replacing the  note. 2009 saw the introduction of a new smaller coinage from 5 to 50 cents. These were struck by the Royal Canadian Mint and are made with the three-ply electroplate method. The 1 and 2 cents were also discontinued and withdrawn the same year. A thinner brass plated steel  coin was later introduced in 2010, gradually phasing out the older type.

In 2013 Fiji released a whole family of new coins, with fauna themes, and without the Queen's portrait. This new series saw the introduction of a  coin, replacing the corresponding note just as the  coin had done before. It was replaced by a larger and thicker Spanish flower shaped  coin in 2014.

Banknotes

First dollar

In 1867, the government treasury issued 1 dollar notes. Levuka (on Ovalau island) issued  and  notes during the 1870s.

Second dollar

The Central Monetary Authority took over the issuance of paper money in 1974, issuing the same denominations, although the 50c note was replaced by a coin on 3 March 1975. In 1986, the Reserve Bank of Fiji began issuing notes. The  note was replaced by a coin in 1995. The  note was introduced in 1996, followed by a  note on 10 April 2007.

2007 Series

2012 Series

Commemorative banknotes

2000 2 Dollars – Millennium
2000 2,000 Dollars – Millennium
2017 7 Dollars – Victory of the Fijian rugby sevens team at the 2016 Summer Olympics in Rio de Janeiro.
2020 50 Dollars – Fiji's 50th Independence Anniversary.
2022 7 Dollars - Fijian Rugby 7s. at the Olympic Games in Tokyo, Japan 
2022 88 Cents - Chinese God of Wealth

Current status and value
On 16 August 2005, Finance Minister Ratu Jone Kubuabola announced that the Cabinet had approved the introduction of a  banknote and the withdrawal of the 1 and 2 cent coin, as the minting cost exceeded its face value. Kubuabola said that the  banknote would measure 156 × 67 mm, with the other banknotes receding at 5 mm towards the lowest banknote denomination. The portrait of Queen Elizabeth II would remain on all banknotes, he added, obviously in answer to calls from some politicians to remove the Queen's portrait from the currency after 18 years as a republic. Fiji is, however, a member of the Commonwealth, and Queen Elizabeth is recognized as Paramount Chief of the Great Council of Chiefs of Fiji. Her portrait was updated to a more mature one, which was released in 2007, becoming the fourth portrait of the Queen to appear on Fijian currency.

In 2009, the demonetization of the 1 and 2 cent coins was made official and a new coin set of 5, 10, 20, and 50 cent coins with reduced size were introduced. The old coins based on the Australian size standard were withdrawn from circulation.  The reformed coins were introduced to save on production costs.  The new 50 cent piece is also round with reeded edges rather than twelve-sided.  On 2 March 2011, it was announced that Fiji would drop Queen Elizabeth II from its coins and notes, instead opting for local flora and fauna. The removal was seen as retaliation for Fiji's suspension from its full membership of the Commonwealth. The new set, which was unveiled on 12 December 2012, was issued on 2 January 2013.  The new series of Fijian coins include a bi-metallic (brass-plated steel)  coin intended to replace the note, and a thinner, reduced weight  coin.  The new series of Fijian dollar banknotes feature Fijian flora and fauna to replace the portrait of Queen Elizabeth II.  One change in the redesign of the Fijian dollar banknotes was the  note. Originally printed on paper, it is now issued as a polymer banknote.

Polymer plastic-coated notes were introduced in 2007, featuring images of local people, culture, trade and industry.  Their sizes vary among denominations

A new series of notes, the "Flora and Fauna" design series, was introduced in 2013, featuring endemic flora and fauna. The image of Queen Elizabeth II no longer features in the new banknote series.  The  note, now coined, ceased to be legal tender on 31 March 2013 and the  note is now printed in green, a change from its previous tawny and brown colour scheme.  The new  note, the first banknote from the "Flora and Fauna" design series, entered into circulation on 2 April 2013.

See also
 Economy of Fiji

References

External links
 The Reserve Bank of Fiji Main Page
 Banks are collecting Fiji coins
 New Banknotes
 Leaflet describing the security features of the Fijian dollar banknotes
 Fiji to drop Queen from currency, telegraph.co.uk
 Coins of Fiji from worldcoingallery.com

Currencies of the British Empire
Currencies of the Commonwealth of Nations
Currencies of Fiji
1867 introductions
Currencies introduced in 1969
1969 establishments in Fiji